Lost Isles is the debut full-length album by British metalcore band Oceans Ate Alaska, released on 24 February 2015 through Fearless Records.

Track listing

Personnel 
Oceans Ate Alaska
James Harrison – lead vocals
Adam Zytkiewicz – lead guitar, backing vocals
James "Jibs" Kennedy – rhythm guitar, backing vocals
Chris Turner – drums, percussions
Mike Stanton – bass guitar

Production
Josh Wickman – production, mixing, mastering
Chris Turner – engineering

Charts

References 

2015 debut albums
Oceans Ate Alaska albums